They Made Her a Spy is a 1939 American spy drama film produced and distributed by RKO Radio Pictures.  It was the first film directed by Jack Hively, who after toiling as an editor for RKO for the prior five years, was given the opportunity to direct, and starred Sally Eilers, Allan Lane, Fritz Leiber, and Frank M. Thomas. The screenplay, written by Jo Pagano and Academy Award winner Michael Kanin, was based on a story by George Bricker and Lionel Houser. The film premiered in New York City on March 29, 1939, and was released nationally two weeks later, on April 14.

References

External links

American drama films
1939 drama films
1939 films
American black-and-white films
Films directed by Jack Hively
1930s American films